The 2020 Hankook 16 Hours of Hockenheimring was the 1st running of the 16 Hours of Hockenheimring. It is the fourth round of both the 2020 24H GT Series and the 2020 24H TCE Series, the third round of the Europe and Continent Series, and will be held from 5 to 6 September at the Hockenheimring. It was the first 24H Series event to take place in Germany. The race was won by Gijs Bessem, Harry Hilders and Marcel van Berlo.

Schedule
The race was split into two parts, the first being 8 hours and the second being 8 hours long due to noise restrictions.

Entry list
A total of fifteen cars were entered for the event; 8 GT and 7 TCE cars.

Results

Practice
Fastest in class in bold.

Qualifying

GT
Fastest in class in bold.

TCE
Fastest in class in bold.

Race

Part 1
Class winner in bold.

Part 2
Class winner in bold.

References

External links

16 Hours of Hockenheimring
16 Hours of Hockenheimring
2020 in 24H Series